The Canadian Track and Field Championships is an annual outdoor track and field competition organized by Athletics Canada, which serves as the Canadian national championships for the sport. The most recent edition of the event took place in Langley, British Columbia in July of 2022. The next Canadian Track and Field Championships will be held in July of 2023, in Langley, B.C.

History
The Canadian Track and Field Championships have their roots in Montreal. During the 1870s the Montreal Lacrosse Club held annual and semi-annual track and field competitions. In some years these served as the Canadian Track and Field Championships, with the first national championships taking place at Montreal on September 27, 1884. The Championships took place every year thereafter except during World War I (1915-1918) and World War II (1940-1945). The women's competition was added in 1925.

Host cities since year 2000:

Editions

Championships records

Men

Women

See also
Athletics Canada
Sports in Canada
Canadian records in track and field
AC Indoor Open
Canadian Marathon Championships
Canadian Half Marathon Championships

References

 
Track and field in Canada
National athletics competitions
Track and field competitions in Canada
1884 establishments in Canada
National championships in Canada